Saudi Arabia is not known to have a nuclear weapons program. From an official and public standpoint, Saudi Arabia has been an opponent of nuclear weapons in the Middle East, having signed the Treaty on the Non-Proliferation of Nuclear Weapons, and is a member of the coalition of countries demanding a Nuclear-weapon-free zone in the Middle East. Studies of nuclear proliferation have not identified Saudi Arabia as a country of concern.
Nuclear technology company IP3 International was formed in June 2016 to transfer nuclear technology from the United States to Saudi Arabia.

However, over the years there have been media reports of Saudi Arabia's intent to purchase a nuclear weapon from an outside source. In 2003, a leaked strategy paper laid out three possible options for the Saudi government: to acquire a nuclear deterrent, to ally with and become protected by an existing nuclear nation, or to try to reach agreement on having a nuclear-free Middle East. UN officials and weapons experts have suggested the review was prompted by a distancing of relations with the United States, concerns over Iran's nuclear program, and a lack of international pressure on Israel to give up its nuclear weapons.

Nuclear deal with United States 
In May 2008, the United States and Saudi Arabia signed a memorandum of understanding, as part of the United States' vintage Atoms for Peace program, to boost Saudi efforts for a civilian nuclear program.  The program did not involve support for the development of nuclear weapons.

Pakistan's involvement

Historically, Pakistan and Saudi Arabia have had a cordial relationship. Pakistani political scientists and historians have noted that Saudi interest in nuclear technology began in 1970s after Prime Minister Zulfikar Ali Bhutto convened a meeting of Pakistan's leading theoretical physicists (who went on to join the King Fahd University of Petroleum and Minerals) with the Saudi royal government during a visit by the Saudi royal family to Pakistan in 1974 as part of the 2nd OIC conference at Lahore. At this meeting, Bhutto noted the advances made in the Israeli and the Indian nuclear programs, which he took as attempts to intimidate the Muslim world.

It is widely believed that Saudi Arabia has been a major financier of Pakistan's own integrated atomic bomb project since 1974, a program founded by former prime minister Zulfikar Ali Bhutto. In the 1980s, Chief Martial Law Administrator and President General Zia-ul-Haq paid a state visit to Saudi Arabia where he unofficially told the King that: "Our achievements are yours". This cooperation was allegedly furthered by socialist prime minister Benazir Bhutto in 1995.  In 1998, the conservative Prime minister Nawaz Sharif informed Saudi Arabia confidentially before ordering the nuclear tests (see Chagai-I and Chagai-II) in the Weapon-testing labs-III (WTL) located in the Chagai remote site in Balochistan Province of Pakistan. In June 1998, the Prime Minister paid a farewell visit to King Fahd and publicly thanked the Saudi government for supporting the country after the tests. Shortly thereafter, Saudi Minister of Defense Prince Sultan went with Prime Minister Sharif on a tour of a classified institute, the Kahuta Research Laboratories (KRL), where leading scientist Abdul Qadeer Khan briefed the Prince and Prime Minister Sharif on nuclear physics and sensitive issues involving nuclear explosive devices.

Since 1998, Western diplomats and intelligence agencies have long believed that an agreement exists in which Pakistan would sell Saudi Arabia nuclear warheads and its own nuclear technology should security in the Persian Gulf deteriorate. Both countries have sharply denied the existence of such an agreement. In 2003, globalsecurity.org reported that Pakistan and Saudi Arabia had entered a secret agreement on nuclear cooperation providing Saudi Arabia with nuclear weapons technology in return for access to cheap oil for Pakistan.

In March 2006, the German magazine Cicero reported that Saudi Arabia had, since 2003, received assistance from Pakistan to acquire nuclear missiles and warheads. Satellite photos allegedly reveal an underground city with nuclear silos containing Ghauri rockets in Al-Sulaiyil, south of the capital Riyadh. There is another, newer ballistic missile base in Al-Watah. Pakistan has denied aiding Saudi Arabia in its nuclear ambitions.

In 2013, BBC reported using multiple sources that Saudi Arabia has funded nuclear weapons development in Pakistan, and various sources also told BBC Persian, regarding Saudi government belief that they are able to gain nuclear weapons at will.

Chinese-Saudi atomic collaboration

In January 2012, Chinese Premier Wen Jiabao signed a mutual cooperation deal on nuclear energy with King Abdullah, during Premier Jiabao's visit to the Middle East. The details of such cooperation were not fully provided by the government-controlled Saudi Press Agency, but according to Hashim Yamani, president of the King Abdullah City for Atomic and Renewable Energy, the kingdom has planned 16 commercial nuclear power reactors by 2030.

Saudi financing of Iraqi nuclear program
In 1994, Mohammed al Khilewi, second-in-command of the Saudi mission to the United Nations, applied for asylum in the United States. He provided a packet of 10,000 documents that allegedly described long-time Saudi support of the Iraqi nuclear weapons program. According to these documents, during Saddam Hussein's administration in Iraq the Saudis supported the Iraqi nuclear program with $5 billion, on the condition that workable nuclear technology and possibly even nuclear weapons would be transferred to Saudi Arabia. Khilewi obtained asylum in the US, with the consent of Saudi Arabia. Khilewi's allegations have not been confirmed by any other source. US officials have stated that they have no evidence of Saudi assistance to Iraqi nuclear development. Saudi officials denied the allegations.

Senior Clinton administration officials responsible for Mideast affairs at the time Khilewi sought asylum, including Robert Pelletreau of the State Department and Bruce Riedel of the National Security Council, said they found nothing in Khilewi's debriefings to back up the Media reports about a Saudi nuclear program. "There was nothing there," Pelletreau said. (Vartan 2005)

Nuclear sharing with Arab States of the Arabic Gulf nuclear programs

The Arab States of the Persian Gulf plan to start their own joint civilian nuclear program.  An agreement in the final days of the Bush administration provided for cooperation between the United Arab Emirates and the United States of America in which the United States would sell the UAE nuclear reactors and nuclear fuel.  The UAE would, in return, renounce their right to enrich uranium for their civilian nuclear program.  At the time of signing, this agreement was touted as a way to reduce risks of nuclear proliferation in the Persian Gulf. However, Mustafa Alani of the Dubai-based Gulf Research Center stated that, should the Nuclear Non-Proliferation Treaty collapse, nuclear reactors such as those slated to be sold to the UAE under this agreement could provide the UAE with a path toward a nuclear weapon, raising the specter of further nuclear proliferation. In March 2007, foreign ministers of the six-member Gulf Cooperation Council met in Saudi Arabia to discuss progress in plans agreed in December 2006, for a joint civilian nuclear program.

Recent developments
In 2011, Prince Turki al-Faisal, who has served as the Saudi intelligence chief and as ambassador to the United States has
suggested that the kingdom might consider producing nuclear weapons if it found itself between the atomic arsenals of Iran and Israel. In 2012, it was confirmed that Saudi Arabia would launch its own nuclear weapons program immediately if Iran successfully developed nuclear weapons. In such an eventuality, Saudi Arabia would start work on a new ballistic missile platform, purchase nuclear warheads from overseas and aim to source uranium to develop weapons-grade material.

Officials in the U.S. alliance believe Saudi Arabia and Pakistan have an understanding in which Islamabad would supply the kingdom with warheads if security in the Persian Gulf was threatened. A U.S. official told The Times that Riyadh could have the nuclear warheads in a matter of days of approaching Islamabad. Pakistan's ambassador to Saudi Arabia, Mohammed Naeem Khan, was quoted as saying that "Pakistan considers the security of Saudi Arabia not just as a diplomatic or an internal matter but as a personal matter." Naeem also said that the Saudi leadership considered Pakistan and Saudi Arabia to be one country. Any threat to Saudi Arabia is also a threat to Pakistan. Other vendors were also likely to enter into a bidding war if Riyadh indicated that it was seeking nuclear warheads. Both Saudi Arabia and Pakistan have denied the existence of any such agreement. Western intelligence sources have told The Guardian that the Saudi monarchy has paid for up to 60% of the Pakistan's atomic bomb projects and in return has the option to buy five to six nuclear warheads off the shelf.

2013 revelations
In November 2013, a variety of sources told BBC Newsnight that Saudi Arabia had invested in Pakistani nuclear weapons projects and believes it could obtain nuclear bombs at will. Earlier in the year, a senior NATO decision maker told Mark Urban, a senior diplomatic and defense editor, that he had seen intelligence reporting that nuclear weapons made in Pakistan on behalf of Saudi Arabia are now sitting ready for delivery. In October 2013, Amos Yadlin, a former head of Israeli military intelligence, told a conference in Sweden that if Iran got the bomb, "the Saudis will not wait one month. They already paid for the bomb, they will go to Pakistan and bring what they need to bring." Since 2009, when King Abdullah of Saudi Arabia warned visiting US special envoy to the Middle East Dennis Ross that if Iran crossed the threshold, "we will get nuclear weapons", the kingdom has sent the Americans numerous signals of its intentions. Gary Samore, who until March 2013 was President Barack Obama's counter-proliferation adviser, told BBC Newsnight: "I do think that the Saudis believe that they have some understanding with Pakistan that, in extremis, they would have claim to acquire nuclear weapons from Pakistan."

Response
According to the US based think-tank, the Center for Strategic and International Studies, the BBC report on possible nuclear sharing between Pakistan and Saudi Arabia is partially incorrect. There is no indication of the validity or credibility of the BBC’s sources, nor does the article expand on what essentially constitutes an unverified lead. It noted that if Pakistan were to transfer nuclear warheads onto Saudi soil, it is highly unlikely that either nation would face any international repercussions if both nations were to follow strict nuclear sharing guidelines similar to that of NATO. A research paper produced by the British House of Commons Defence Select Committee states that as long as current NATO nuclear sharing arrangements remain in place, NATO states would have few valid grounds for complaint if such a transfer were to occur.

2015
In May 2015, in response to The Sunday Times of London report that the Saudis had "taken the 'strategic decision' to acquire 'off-the-shelf' atomic weapons from Pakistan," amid growing fears of a nuclear-armed Iran, a Saudi defense official dismissed it as speculation.

2018
In March 2018, the crown prince said if Iran decided to build a nuclear weapon, "we will follow suit as soon as possible". This prompted U.S. Senator Ed Markey to comment "nuclear energy in Saudi Arabia is about more than just electrical power", implying Saudi Arabia was interested in nuclear power to gain the skills to be able to develop weapons. This potentially reduces the probability of a nuclear deal with the U.S.

in May 2018, Al Jazeera media reported the statement from the former director of Al Arabiya TV, Abdul Rahman Al-Rashed, who wrote in the Ash-Sharq Al-Awsat newspaper an article while accompanying Prince Mohammed bin Salman on his recent visit to Washington that no one can confirm if Saudi Arabia is capable of building a nuclear weapon yet. However, the news former director has pointed out that Riyadh owns uranium materials in its desert, and has adopted a plan to extract it within 2030.

2019
In March, Donald Trump's administration approved a deal allowing Saudi Arabia access to nuclear secrets through the U.S. Energy Secretary Rick Perry, with an approval known as Part 810 authorizations. Although it doesn't allow to access equipment required to process Uranium, it allows the 6 companies involved to do preliminary work on nuclear power ahead of any deal. In a document from the Department of Energy’s National Nuclear Security Administration (NNSA) each of the companies which received access requested that the NNSA withhold their authorization from public release.

2020
According to reports, Saudi Arabia initiated the construction of its first research reactor at the King Abdulaziz City for Science and Technology. In May 2020, satellite images revealed that a roof concealed the cylindrical reactor vessel, which was visible through roof beams in a satellite picture until 15 March 2020. The Kingdom was using the division for the generation of electricity, to export crude consumed for domestic energy needs, generate more revenue for the government, and create a handful of job opportunities. However, experts raised a doubt, as the country already possessed cheaper, safer, and renewable ways to achieve these objectives from sunlight. It was also reported that Saudi Arabia did not sign up to halt the enrichment of uranium, reprocessing of spent fuel and neither signed the 123 Agreement with the United States.

Saudi Arabia constructed a facility for extracting uranium yellowcake from uranium ore with the help of China. According to a western official, the facility was built near the remote town of AlUla. Saudi Arabia has signed most limited safeguard agreement with the International Atomic Energy Agency.

On 17 September 2020, The Guardian reported Saudi Arabia of being in possession of enough uranium ore reserves to produce 90,000 tonnes worth of uranium. It stated the finding on the basis of the reports compiled by the Beijing Research Institute of Uranium Geology (BRIUG) and the China National Nuclear Corporation (CNNC), in association with Saudi Geological survey. As per the reports, three different deposits in the central and northwest region of the country were reported to be potential for the extraction. The disclosure reportedly increased concerns regarding Riyadh’s aggressive interest in developing atomic weapons program. In this report geologists identified some reserves near the controversial Neom megacity development are and estimated that Saudi could produce over 90,000 tonnes of uranium from three deposits.

2023
In January 2023, Saudi Arabian Energy Minister Prince Abdulaziz Bin Salman said Saudi Arabia plans to use domestically-sourced uranium in its future nuclear power industry, including developing the full nuclear fuel cycle. He said "This would involve the entire nuclear fuel cycle which involves the production of yellowcake, low enriched uranium and the manufacturing of nuclear fuel both for our national use and, of course, for export."

Missile capability

In 1987, Saudi Arabia purchased Chinese-made CSS-2 intermediate-range ballistic missiles designed and used by the Chinese as a nuclear-armed missile, but reportedly sold to Saudi Arabia with conventional high-explosive warheads. However their low circular error probable accuracy (1–1.5 km) makes them unsuitable for effective military use against military targets when carrying a conventional warhead. The CSS-2 has a range of 4,850 km with a payload of either 2,150 or 2,500 kg. These missiles were delivered with between 50 and 35 transporter erector launcher trucks. These missiles were the first weapons of the Royal Saudi Strategic Missile Force, a separate branch of Saudi Arabia's armed forces. In 2013 the existence of the Royal Saudi Strategic Missile Force was officially announced.

Newsweek quoted an anonymous source in 2014 that Saudi Arabia had acquired CSS-5 intermediate-range ballistic missiles from China in 2007 with "Washington's quiet approval on the condition that CIA technical experts could verify they were not designed to carry nuclear warheads". The Center for Strategic and International Studies lists the CSS-5 as being capable of carrying either 250-kiloton or 500-kiloton nuclear or various types of conventional high-explosive warheads. The CSS-5, while it has a comparatively shorter range (2,800 km) and half the payload (1 ton) of the CSS-2, is solid-fueled, thus can be set up and placed on alert status more easily than the liquid-fueled CSS-2, and its accuracy is much greater (circular error probable of 30 meters).

See also 

 Nuclear energy in Saudi Arabia
 Saudi Arabia and weapons of mass destruction

References

External links
King Abdullah City for Atomic and Renewable Energy  (K.A.CARE is a city that aims to develop nuclear energy in Saudi Arabia)
Nuclear Power in Saudi Arabia

Economy of Saudi Arabia
 
Politics of Saudi Arabia
Government of Saudi Arabia
Saudi Arabia
Foreign relations of Saudi Arabia
Pakistan–Saudi Arabia relations
Nuclear weapons programs